The California Department of Education is an agency within the Government of California that oversees public education.

The department oversees funding and testing, and holds local educational agencies accountable for student achievement. Its stated mission is to provide leadership, assistance, oversight, and resources (via teaching and teaching material) so that every Californian has access to a good education.

The State Board of Education is the governing and policy-making body, and the State Superintendent of Public Instruction is the nonpartisan (originally partisan) elected executive officer. The Superintendent serves as the state's chief spokesperson for public schools, provides education policy and direction to local school districts, and sits as an ex officio member of governing boards of the state's higher education system that are otherwise independent of the department.

History

In 1920, the California State Legislature's Special Legislative Committee on Education conducted a comprehensive investigation of California's educational system.  The Committee's final report, drafted by Ellwood Patterson Cubberley, explained that the system's chaotic ad hoc development had resulted in the division of jurisdiction over education at the state level between 23 separate boards and commissions, with a total of about 160 members.  The report recommended the consolidation and centralization of all these entities under the jurisdiction of a single California Department of Education, and also to clarify the exact relationship between the existing State Board of Education and the State Superintendent of Public Instruction.  Therefore, on May 31, 1921, the legislature enacted a bill creating such a department, to be headed by a Director of Education, and which also concurrently made the State Superintendent of Public Instruction the ex officio director of the new department. (The sole entity exempt from the new department's jurisdiction was the University of California, because of a 1886 court case involving control of the Hastings College of the Law.)

Among the various entities thus integrated were the State Normal Schools, which lost their boards of trustees, were made subordinate to the department's deputy director for the Division of Normal and Special Schools, and were renamed State Teachers Colleges. This created a rather bizarre administrative situation from 1921 to 1960.  On the one hand, the department's actual supervision of the presidents of the State Teachers Colleges was rather minimal, which translated into substantial autonomy when it came to day-to-day operations. On the other hand, the State Teachers Colleges were treated under state law as ordinary state agencies, which meant their budgets were subject to the same stifling bureaucratic financial controls as all other state agencies (except the University of California).   At least one president would depart his state college because of his express frustration over that issue (J. Paul Leonard, then-president of San Francisco State, in 1957). The State Teachers Colleges were renamed State Colleges in 1935, but retained the same legal status. They finally regained full administrative autonomy after the recommendations of the California Master Plan for Higher Education were signed into law as the Donahoe Higher Education Act of 1960, which created the State College System of California (now the California State University) and authorized the appointment of a board of trustees and systemwide chancellor who would be independent of the department.  

In 1967, the state's junior colleges (which had largely developed as extensions of existing high school districts at the local level) were renamed community colleges and organized into a new system called the California Community Colleges, and that system was then authorized to have its own board of governors and systemwide chancellor who would also be independent of the department.

Since 1967, the department has been focused on regulating and supporting local school districts which directly provide the bulk of K-12 primary and secondary education throughout the state, as well as operating the state's three special schools and three diagnostic centers in support of special education.

Ethnic studies
In March of 2021, after four years of development, the State Board of Education unanimously passed a new ethnic studies curriculum.  A bill that would have made ethnic studies a high school requirement had been vetoed by California's Governor the previous fall.

2021 Mathematics Framework

In response to academic inequity, the department is recommending elimination of accelerated math classes.  The Framework advises Algebra I be delayed for all students until 9th grade, and that all students take identical math classes until 10th grade.

See also

 California State Superintendent of Public Instruction
 California State Board of Education
 California Commission on Teacher Credentialing
 School accreditation
 List of school districts in California
 List of school districts in California by county

Colleges and Universities
 California Community Colleges System
 California State University
 University of California
 List of colleges and universities in California

References

External links 

 Official Website
 California Department of Education in the California Code of Regulations
 California Education Code of the California Codes
 DataQuest: Department of Education Data and Statistics
 California Department of Education on USAspending.gov

California Department
Education
State departments of education of the United States
School accreditors
1921 establishments in California